Butte Falls Secondary School is a public high school in Butte Falls, Oregon, United States.

Academics
In 2008, 92% of the school's seniors received their high school diploma. Of 25 students, 23 graduated, one dropped out, and one received a modified diploma.

References

High schools in Jackson County, Oregon
Butte Falls, Oregon
Public high schools in Oregon